Tshitereke Baldwin Matibe is a South African politician who has served as Deputy Speaker of the Limpopo Provincial Legislature since October 2022. A member of the African National Congress (ANC), he was sworn in to the provincial legislature in January 2022 after serving in the National Council of Provinces since 2019. Before that, he was the Executive Mayor of Vhembe District Municipality from June 2012 to August 2016, and he has chaired the ANC's regional branch in Vhembe since 2012.

Education and early career 
From 1987 to 1990, Matibe attended the University of Venda, where he completed a Bachelor of Arts in education. In the 1990s, he was a steward in the South African Democratic Teachers Union. At the same time, beginning in the early 1990s, he rose through the local and regional ranks of the ANC in Limpopo, holding leadership roles in his local party branch and the Mutale subregional branch. In 2010, he was elected chairperson of the latter. He also served a stint as Mayor of Mutale Local Municipality.

In May 2012, while still Mutale chairperson, Matibe was elected Regional Chairperson of the ANC's branch in Vhembe. He defeated the incumbent, Falaza Mdaka, to take the position, earning 177 votes against Mdaka's 143. Nandi Ndalane was elected as his deputy. Weeks later, on 12 June 2012, Matibe was sworn in as Executive Mayor of Vhembe District Municipality. He succeeded Florence Radzilani, who had been appointed to the Limpopo Executive Council. He remained in the mayoral office until the 2016 local elections, when Radzilani returned to replace him. The following year, at a party elective conference in July 2017, he narrowly defeated Makonde Mathivha to retain his party office as ANC Regional Chairperson, receiving 161 votes against Mathivha's 153.

Legislative career 
In the 2019 general election, Matibe was elected as a Delegate to the National Council of Provinces (NCOP), ranked 47th on the ANC's provincial party list for Limpopo. While in the NCOP he served as the whip for the caucus of ANC delegates representing Limpopo. In December 2021, he was re-elected as ANC Regional Chairperson in Vhembe, beating Dowelani Nenguda, the incumbent Mayor of Vhembe and Matibe's outgoing deputy, with 204 votes to Nenguda's 174. 

In January 2022, the ANC announced that Matibe would be moved to the Limpopo Provincial Legislature to fill a casual vacancy arising from the resignation of Goodman Mtileni; he was sworn in as a Member of the Provincial Legislature on 20 January. In October of that year, the party named Matibe as the new Deputy Speaker of the Limpopo Provincial Legislature; he succeeded Jerry Ndou, who was sworn in to the NCOP. Ahead of the ANC's 55th National Conference in December that year, Matibe was an outspoken supporter of incumbent ANC President Cyril Ramaphosa.

References

External links 

 

Living people
Members of the Limpopo Provincial Legislature
Members of the National Council of Provinces
Mayors of places in South Africa
African National Congress politicians
Year of birth missing (living people)
21st-century South African politicians